Paul Harris (September 15, 1917 – August 25, 1985) was an American actor with a commanding presence. He had roles in films such as All Night Long, Across 110th Street, The Slams , Truck Turner and Baby Needs a New Pair of Shoes aka Jive Turkey.

Background
Harris was born and raised in Pasadena, California. At the age of sixteen, he became tremendously interested in entertainment and the theatrical world. Paul decided to study professionally at the Hebert Wall School of Music and The Actors Laboratory, both in Hollywood. He was chosen over many fine actors to study and appear in plays at the Pasadena Community Playhouse.

Paul Harris became one of the first known Black Actors and singers, appearing with such renowned organizations as the “George Garner Community Sing Association”, “The DePaur Infantry Chorus”, which took him to New York where he studied at the American Theatre Wing. Paul traveled the U.S. with the touring company of the Broadway hit “SHOWBOAT” for over a year. He also traveled the world with George Gershwin's company of “PORGY & BESS” which was supported by the United States and sponsored by the State Department. This exposure propelled him to become involved in theatrical enterprises in such European countries as England, Italy, France, and Germany.

Harris at one time was engaged to Danish model Maud Berthelsen, who later became an actress. She was nominated for best supporting actress in the film Epilogue.

Harris died of cancer in Los Angeles, California, on the 25th of August, 1985. He is buried at Forest Lawn Memorial Park, Hollywood Hills.

Career

Stage
Harris was a singer, stage, film and television actor. He had appeared on Broadway and had been part of international theater tours. In 1949, he played the part of the doorman in the musical comedy Show Boat which was playing at Los Angeles's Greek Theater. The following month he was in the musical Annie, Get Your Gun as Major Domo.

Film and television
In the late 1950s, looking for work, he left the United States for Europe. He came to Paris with the cast of Free and Easy. In England he secured a starring role in the 1962 film All Night Long. In it he played the part of piano player Aurelius Rex in an Othello-like role who becomes victim of the devious and sinister motivated actions by his drummer Johnny Cousin, played by Patrick McGoohan. He is almost driven into an act of violence against his partner, singer Delia, played by Marti Stevens. In 1966, he had a part in an episode of The Baron which starred Steve Forrest, episode: There's Someone Close Behind You as Wayne. In 1974, he had a role in the film Truck Turner that starred Isaac Hayes. He played the part of a mean and ruthless pimp, Gator Johnson. In 1974, Harris got a leading role as Pasha in the low-budget film Jive Turkey aka Baby Needs a New Pair of Shoes. The film also starred Frank deKova.

Stage and musical appearances

Filmography

References

External links
 
 Free And Easy review

1917 births
1985 deaths
American male actors
African-American male actors
20th-century American male actors
Male actors from Los Angeles
20th-century African-American people